Rhagadiolus stellatus, the endive daisy, is a species of annual herb in the family Asteraceae. They have a self-supporting growth form and simple, broad leaves. Individuals can grow to 0.22 m.

Sources

References 

Cichorieae
Flora of Malta